Le Messager FC de Bujumbura is a football club from Burundi. The team currently plays in Burundi Premier League.

External links
Soccerway

Football clubs in Burundi